These are the Official Charts Company's UK Indie Chart number-one albums of 2009.

The biggest-selling indie album of the year was Invaders Must Die by The Prodigy.

Chart history

See also
List of number-one albums of 2009 (UK)
List of UK Dance Chart number-one albums of 2009
List of UK Indie Chart number-one singles of 2009
List of UK Rock Chart number-one albums of 2009
List of UK R&B Chart number-one albums of 2009

References

External links
Independent Albums Chart at the Official Charts Company
UK Top 40 Indie Album Chart at BBC Radio 1

Number-one indie albums
United Kingdom Indie Albums
2009